Tazeh Kand-e Loqmanabad (also Romanized as Tāzeh Kand-e Loqmānābād; also known as Tāzeh Kand) is a village in Vilkij-e Markazi Rural District, Vilkij District, Namin County, Ardabil Province, Iran. At the 2006 census, its population was 55, in 12 families.

References 

Towns and villages in Namin County